Pashupati Aryaghat is a ghat located near Pashupatinath Temple, Kathmandu, Nepal. It is one of the most famous ghats in Nepal.

References 

Ghats of Nepal
Pashupatinath Temple
Crematoria in Nepal